The Gilorțel (also: Gilorțelul Mare) is a left tributary of the river Gilort in Romania. It flows into the Gilort in Novaci.

References

Rivers of Romania
Rivers of Gorj County